Valsta Syrianska IK was a Swedish based football club in Märsta, a suburb of Stockholm. The club was established in 1993 by Syriac immigrants arriving from Turkey. The club became defunct in 2015.

History
Valsta Syrianska IK was established in 1993 in Märsta, Stockholm. The club was formed following the merger of Valsta IK (Division 6 team) and the Syrianska association. The new club started in Division 6 and progressed through the Swedish football league system winning Division 6 in 1994, Division 5 in 1996, Division 4 in 1997 and Division 3 in 2000. Since 2006 the club has played in Division 1 Norra, the third tier of Swedish football until they were relegated to Division 2 after the 2011 season.

On 15 February 2015 it was announced that the club had reached bankruptcy, resulting in a withdrawal from the Swedish league system.

Season to season

Attendances

In recent seasons Valsta Syrianska IK have had the following average attendances:

See also
List of Assyrian-Syriac football teams in Sweden

External links
Valsta Syrianska IK

Footnotes

Association football clubs disestablished in 2015
Assyrian football clubs
Assyrian/Syriac football clubs in Sweden
Defunct football clubs in Sweden
Association football clubs established in 1993
Sport in Stockholm County
1993 establishments in Sweden
Diaspora sports clubs